New Agenda is a jazz album by drummer Elvin Jones recorded in 1975 and released on the Vanguard label.

Track listing
 "Someone's Rocking My Jazzboat" (Frank Foster) - 6:50 
 "Naima" (John Coltrane) - 6:08 
 "Haresah" (Steve Grossman) - 8:07 
 "Anti-Calypso" (Roland Prince) - 5:19 
 "Stefanie" (Ed Bland) - 4:40 
 "My Lover" (Sutekina Hito) - 3:36 
 "Agenda" (Elvin Jones) - 7:48

Personnel
Elvin Jones  - drums 
Joe Farrell - tenor & soprano saxophone (tracks 5 & 7)
Frank Foster (tracks 1, 2 & 5), Azar Lawrence (tracks 3 & 4) - tenor saxophone, soprano saxophone 
Steve Grossman - tenor saxophone, soprano saxophone, flute
Kenny Barron (track 1), Gene Perla (tracks 5 & 7) - piano
Roland Prince - guitar
David Williams - bass
Frank Ippolito (tracks 1, 2, 4, 5 & 7), Guilherme Franco (tracks 3 & 4), Candido Camero (tracks 5 & 7) - percussion

References

Elvin Jones albums
1975 albums
Vanguard Records albums